The 1973 Stanley Cup Finals was the championship series of the National Hockey League's (NHL) 1972–73 season, and the culmination of the 1973 Stanley Cup playoffs. It was contested between the Chicago Black Hawks and the Montreal Canadiens, a rematch of the 1971 Final. The Canadiens won the best-of-seven series, four games to two.

Paths to the Finals
Chicago defeated the St. Louis Blues 4–1 and the New York Rangers 4–1 to advance to the final.

Montreal defeated the Buffalo Sabres 4–2 and the Philadelphia Flyers 4–1 to set up an "Original Six" final.

Game summaries
Yvan Cournoyer and Jacques Lemaire would both have 12 points in the finals for the Canadiens.  The Conn Smythe Trophy went to Cournoyer, who had six goals. It was Henri Richard's eleventh and last win of the Stanley Cup and Scotty Bowman's first.

Team rosters

Montreal Canadiens

|}

Chicago Black Hawks

Note: ''Stan Mikita served as the Black Hawks unofficial team captain during the 1973 Stanley Cup playoffs. Mikita was the alternate captain with the longest tenure in the league on the roster at the time of the playoffs.

Stanley Cup engraving
The 1973 Stanley Cup was presented to Canadiens captain Henri Richard by NHL President Clarence Campbell following the Canadiens 6–4 win over the Black Hawks in game six.

The following Canadiens players and staff had their names engraved on the Stanley Cup

1972–73 Montreal Canadiens

See also
 1972–73 NHL season
 1972–73 Chicago Black Hawks season
 1972–73 Montreal Canadiens season

Notes

References
 
 

Stanley Cup
Stanley Cup Finals
Chicago Blackhawks games
Montreal Canadiens games
Stanley Cup Finals
Stanley Cup Finals
Ice hockey competitions in Montreal
Ice hockey competitions in Chicago
1970s in Montreal
1973 in Quebec
Stanley Cup Finals
1970s in Chicago